Aryan Chopra (born 10 December 2001) is an Indian chess prodigy who became a grandmaster (GM) in 2016, at the age of 14 years, 9 months and 3 days. The title was officially awarded by FIDE in 2017. He became the second youngest Indian to become Grandmaster, after Parimarjan Negi. Currently he is India's fifth youngest Grandmaster.

Chess career
Chopra began playing chess at the age of six after an accident left him temporarily house-bound.

Chopra achieved his first grandmaster norm at the 2015 Riga Technical University Open where he remained unbeaten. He earned his second GM norm at the 35th Zalakaros Open in May 2016 by putting up a strong performance and defeating multiple grandmasters. Chopra earned his third and final GM norm on 29 August 2016 when he defeated GM Samvel Ter-Sahakyan of Armenia with black pieces in the final round of the Abu Dhabi Chess Championship Masters Tournament . He was officially awarded the title in March 2017.

He was part of the world team that convincingly beat the US team 30.5-17.5 in the 2017 Match of the Millennials held in St. Louis. He played in the under-17 section and scored 3.5/6 to help the world team win the section 19-13.

Chopra finished third in the 2017 Abu Dhabi Chess Masters tournament, behind winner Amin Bassem and runner-up  Nigel Short. He beat multiple grandmasters and gained 22 elo points on his way to scoring 6.5/9 points. He ended the tournament with a notable victory over GM Levan Pantsulaia of Georgia with black pieces.

References

External links

Aryan Chopra chess games at 365Chess.com

2001 births
Living people
Chess grandmasters
Indian chess players